Mary Craig (2 July 1928 – 3 December 2019) was a journalist and a British writer. She lived in Hampshire, England.

A prolific author, she wrote 14 books since 1978, including a trilogy on Tibet, biographies of personalities, including John Paul II, Lech Walesa and Frank Pakenham. She also wrote autobiographical works that addressed the death of Frank, her husband who died of cancer, and the story of their son suffering from Hurler syndrome. The website of her book Voices from Silence says, "Many of her books share a common theme of the examination of spirituality in the post war world."

She was the author of Kundun, the first biography of the 14th Dalai Lama to contextualize his story with that of his family members.

To write her book about the Chinese occupation of Tibet (Tears of Blood (1992)), she visited several times Dharamsala, home of the 14th Dalai Lama and of the Central Tibetan Administration, where she forges bonds of lasting friendships. In 1993, she made numerous visits to Dharamsala to interview members of the family of the Dalai Lama to write Kundun, regretting she could not meet the mother of the Dalai Lama, Dekyi Tsering (Amala), disappeared before her visit in North India.

Publications 
 Voices From Silence, 2010, 
 The Pocket Dalai Lama, 2002, Shambhala Pubns, 
  His Holiness the Dalai Lama: In My Own Words, 2001, Hodder & Stoughton, 
 Blessings: A Heartwarming Classic of Hope, Sorin Books; 2000, 
 Waiting for the sun: the harrowing story of a peasant boy in occupied Tibet, Hodder & Stoughton, 1999, 
 Kundun - A Biography of the Family of the Dalai Lama, 1997, Counterpoint, Washington D.C., 
 The Last Freedom, Hodder & Stoughton, 1997, 
 Tears of Blood, HarperCollins, 1992, Counterpoint, 1999, 
  Lech Walesa : the leader of Solidarity and campaigner for freedom and human rights in Poland, Exley, 1989, 
  Candles in the dark : six modern martyrs, Hodder and Stoughton, 1984, 
 The crystal spirit : Lech Wałęsa and his Poland, Coronet, 1986, 
  Man from a Far Country : A Portrait of Pope John Paul II, Hodder and Stoughton, 1979, 
 Blessings : an autobiographical fragment, Morrow, 1979, 
 Longford : a biographical portrait, Hodder and Stoughton, 1978, 

Spark from Heaven: The Mystery of the Madonna of Medjugorje Paperback  – Aug 1988 
by Mary Craig   (Author)Publisher: Hodder & Stoughton Ltd (1 Jun. 1988)
Language: English

References 

1928 births
British women journalists
British writers
Tibetologists
2019 deaths